St Mary's Church, Betws-y-Coed, is in the village of Betws-y-Coed, Conwy, Wales. It is an active Anglican parish church of the Church in Wales, in the deanery of Arllechwedd, the archdeaconry of Bangor and the diocese of Bangor. The church is designated by Cadw as a Grade II* listed building.

History

The church was built between 1870 and 1873 to accommodate the increasing numbers of summer visitors to the area. It was designed by the Lancaster partnership of Paley and Austin, the commission being gained as a result of a competition won by Hubert Austin. The principal benefactor was the Liverpool businessman Charles Kurtz. The church was consecrated in July 1873, and provided seating for 150 people.  It replaced a medieval church dedicated to Saint Michael, and cost £5,000 (equivalent to £ in ). The tower was completed in 1907.

Architecture

Exterior
St Mary's is constructed in rubble stone with sandstone dressings, and it has slated roofs. Its architectural style is Transitional Norman.  The plan is cruciform with a tower at the crossing and an organ chamber to its south. To the west of the crossing is a four-bay nave with a clerestory, north and south aisles, and a north porch. To the east of the crossing is a chancel. On the north side of the tower is a four-stage stair turret with a conical roof. The middle stage of the tower has lancet windows, and in the top stage are louvred lancets flanking clock faces. On the south side is blind arcading. The parapet is stepped at the corners. Along the sides of aisles, clerestories and chancel are more lancet windows. At the east end is a five-light window with plate tracery, and at the west end is a rose window, also with plate tracery.

Interior
Inside the church are arcades with pointed arches. The font is constructed in black and burgundy marble, and the pulpit is in sandstone; both are in Early English style. In the south wall of the chancel is a recess, and in the north wall is an aumbry. The chancel is floored with tiles. The choir stalls and reading desks are in Arts and Crafts style. The reredos, inserted in 1929, is in Italian alabaster, and depicts the Passion of Christ. Most of the stained glass was made by Shrigley and Hunt of Lancaster. Other windows were made by Jones and Willis, based on designs by Edward Burne-Jones. The two-manual organ was built in 1870 by Gray and Davison. It was enlarged in about 1913 and again in about 1920 by the same firm. In 1969 the organ was rebuilt by Wood Wordsworth and Company.

See also
List of ecclesiastical works by Paley and Austin

References

Bibliography

External links
Artwork at St Mary's Church, Betws-y-Coed

Saint Marys Church
Grade II* listed churches in Conwy County Borough
Gothic Revival church buildings in Wales
Betws-y-Coed
Betws-y-Coed
Paley and Austin buildings
Churches completed in 1907